St. Mary's Church, Wollaton Park, is a parish church in the Church of England.  It is located in Wollaton, Nottingham.

History

St. Mary's Wollaton Park was designed by the architect Thomas Cecil Howitt and was opened in 1939.

The church was originally served by curates from Holy Trinity Church, Lenton, but in 1957 it became a parish church in its own right.

List of incumbents

 Revd E. Strickland
 ?
 Revd Robin Fletcher, c. 1963-1973
 Revd Malcolm Kitchen c. 1973-1988
 Revd Frank Sudworth
 ?
 Revd Henry Curran c. 2009–2021
 Revd Robert Brewis 2023-Present

Features

It contains a font which is modelled on the 12th century one from Lenton Priory now in Holy Trinity Church, Lenton.

Organ

The organ was built by J. W. Walker & Sons Ltd in 1938. The instrument has been erected in a divided position at the west end of the church, the detached console being placed at rear of the choir stalls on the south side of the chancel.

Organists
Dennis Marriot 1938-1941 from Holy Trinity Church, Lenton
Mr. Towlson 1942
Mr. Whitehead 1943-1951
Mr. Williams 1952
Mr. Baker 1953-1956
David Reynolds 1957-1965
P.L. Noble 1965
Mr. Kirk 1966-1968
Peter Price 1968-1974
Mr. Welton 1974
Mr. Beck 1974-
Mrs. C. Smith 1977
Mr. D Laregrove 1981

References

The Buildings of England, Nottinghamshire. Nikolaus Pevsner

External links
See St. Mary's Church on Google Street View

Churches in Nottingham
Grade II listed churches in Nottinghamshire
Churches completed in 1939
20th-century Church of England church buildings
Church of England church buildings in Nottinghamshire
Conservative evangelical Anglican churches in England